Halfon is a surname. Notable people with the surname include:

Alon Halfon (born 1973), Israeli footballer
Ben-Zion Halfon (1930–1977), Israeli politician
Eduardo Halfon (born 1971), Guatemalan writer
Felix Halfon (born 1972), Israeli footballer
Mordechai Halfon (born 1957), Israeli footballer
Robert Halfon (born 1969), English politician
Simon Halfon, British graphic designer